Madathikkadu is a village in the Pattukkottai taluk of Thanjavur district, Tamil Nadu, India.

Demographics 

As per the 2001 census, Madathikkadu had a total population of 1601 with 828 males and 773 females. The sex ratio was 934. The literacy rate was 74.02.

References 

 

Villages in Thanjavur district